Türk Telekom Ankara is a professional volleyball team based in Ankara, Turkey. It plays in the Turkish Women's Volleyball League and in the Women's CEV Cup. Türk Telekom multisports was established in 1954. The section volleyball was opened in 1998.

Türk Telekom Volleyball branch closed on July 24, 2009.

Previous names
8 June 2004 - 22 August 2004 : Türk Telekom Aycell Ankara
23 August 2004 - 5 June 2006 : Türk Telekom Avea Ankara  
6 June 2006 - July 24, 2009: Türk Telekom Ankara

Team Roster Season 2008-2009

See also
See also Türk Telekom B.K. Basketball team.
See also Türk Telekomspor Football team.

References

External links
Official website

Volleyball clubs in Ankara
Volleyball clubs established in 1954
1954 establishments in Turkey